Enicoscolus is a genus of March flies (Bibionidae).

Species
E. brachycephalus Hardy, 1961
E. collessi Hardy, 1962
E. dolichocephalus Hardy, 1961
E. hardyi Fitzgerald, 1997

References

Bibionidae
Nematocera genera